The 1987 Great Taste Coffee Makers season was the 13th season of the franchise in the Philippine Basketball Association (PBA). Known as Great Taste Instant Milk in the Reinforced Conference.

Transactions

Trades

Awards
Allan Caidic was named the season's Rookie of the year.
Forward Abe King was voted SCOOP Most Outstanding player of the All-Filipino finals series.  
Rookie of the year winner Allan Caidic, along with teammate Philip Cezar, made it to the Mythical first team selection.

Championship
The Great Taste Coffee Makers regain the All-Filipino Conference crown, scoring a 3-0 sweep over Hills Bros. Coffee Kings for their fifth PBA title as coach Baby Dalupan won his 14th overall championship.

PBA-IBA series
On September 20, the PBA stage a special tournament in partnership with a new league in the United States called International Basketball Association (IBA) for players 6"4 and below, the top three teams in the All-Filipino Conference participated in a four-team field, along with the IBA Selection. PBA teams fielded two imports and Great Taste paraded Dexter Shouse, on loan to Shell, and Dwight Moody. Great Taste unveil its new product and renamed its team Great Taste Instant Milk starting with this one-week sideshow. The Milk Masters landed in a one-game championship and lost to the IBA All Stars.

Notable dates
April 2: Great Taste humiliated Ginebra San Miguel, 145-121, for their third straight win after an opening day loss and forge a three-way tie for leadership with Tanduay and Magnolia with similar 3-1 won-loss slates. Import Michael Young led the Coffee Makers with 46 points and got ample support from rookie Allan Caidic's 28 points.

April 7: Great Taste overwhelmed Magnolia Ice Cream, 119-106, leading by as many as 23 points in the final quarter. Michael Young and Allan Caidic's three-point bombs ripped the game apart from a 69-all deadlock in the third period.

April 30: Great Taste pulled off a 152-140 overtime win over Ginebra San Miguel to move into a share of the lead with Tanduay at seven wins and two losses in the Open Conference. Rookie Allan Caidic scored 16 of the Coffee Makers' amazing 26 points in the extension period and finish with 32 points. Michael Young and Ricardo Brown, whose combined last 8 points in regulation forces an overtime, scored 59 and 33 points respectively.

July 21: Great Taste seized solo leadership and remain unbeaten in three starts in the All-Filipino Conference, topping Hills Bros. Coffee Kings, 102-90.

July 30: Allan Caidic scored 27 points and hit a clutch triple as Great Taste hold off Tanduay, 116-113, for their fifth win in six games and push the Rhum Makers to the brink of elimination in the All-Filipino Conference with their fifth loss with only one win.

October 15: Drawing inspiration from the return of Ricardo Brown, the Great Taste Milk Masters turned back Tanduay Rhum Makers, 143-124, for their first win in the Reinforced Conference after losing their first three games. The Milk Masters withstood the torrid shooting of Tanduay import Freeman Williams in the third quarter which gave him a total of 72 points.

October 25: Darryl Kennedy scored 43 points to lead Great Taste to a 114-105 win over San Miguel Beer for only their second victory in seven games. Kennedy replaces Jeff Taylor after the Milk Masters posted a 1-4 won-loss card in the first round of eliminations.

Roster

Imports

References

Great Taste Coffee Makers seasons
Great